The Apple Tavern in Guilderland, New York was built in 1760 (or 1765).  It was listed on the National Register of Historic Places in 1982. The listing included four contributing buildings on a  area.

The tavern was built in 1760 (or 1765) on what was, or became, the Schoharie Turnpike or Schoharie Road or Old Schoharie Road. Its original owners were owners Hendrick (Henry) Appel and his wife, Eve.  It was renovated significantly in the 19th century.  In 1803 it was the site of meeting to form the town of Guilderland.

In the 1980s and later it has been operated as a bed and breakfast, antique shop, and wedding and event venue known as the Appel Inn.

See also
 National Register of Historic Places listings in Albany County, New York

References

External links

Commercial buildings completed in 1760
Buildings and structures in Albany County, New York
Taverns in New York (state)
National Register of Historic Places in Albany County, New York
Taverns on the National Register of Historic Places in New York (state)